Zagheh District is a district (bakhsh) in Khorramabad County, Lorestan Province, Iran. At the 2006 census, its population was 19,273, in 4,127 families.  The District has one city: Zagheh.  The District contains three Rural Districts: Qaedrahmat Rural District, Razan Rural District, and Zagheh Rural District.

References 

Districts of Lorestan Province
Khorramabad County